C.D. Tiburones is a Honduran football club. It is based on Choluteca, Honduras. It currently plays in Liga de Ascenso de Honduras.  They played in the Honduran first division in the 1978–79 season.

League performance

Achievements
Segunda División
Winners (1): 1977

References

Football clubs in Honduras